The 1967 LFF Lyga was the 46th season of the LFF Lyga football competition in Lithuania.  It was contested by 15 teams, and Saliutas Vilnius won the championship.

League standings

References
RSSSF

LFF Lyga seasons
1967 in Lithuania
LFF